Pronesopupa hystricella is a species of air-breathing land snail, a terrestrial  pulmonate  gastropod  mollusk  in the family Pupillidae. This species is endemic to Hawaii.

References

Pronesopupa
Molluscs of Hawaii
Gastropods described in 1920
Taxonomy articles created by Polbot